Krishna Leela may refer to:
 Krishna Leela (1946 film), a Bollywood film
 Krishna Leela (2015 film), an Indian Kannada-language romance film
 Krishnaleela, a 1947 Indian Kannada-language film